The Midwestern Robotics Design Competition (MRDC) is an annual student-run robotics competition held every March at the University of Illinois Urbana-Champaign (UIUC), where participant teams compete with self-constructed robots in an annual game objective. The competition was first held in 1987 and is one of the oldest continuing robotics competitions in the United States. Prior to 2016, it was named the AMD Jerry Sanders Creative Design Competition (JSDC) after Jerry Sanders, a University of Illinois alumnus and the co-founder and former long-time CEO of AMD.

A different game objective is created every year, intended to test the competitors' skills in creative design and functionality. Team registration usually ends in January, and is open to any college or university team. Multiple independent teams from the same university are allowed. Participating teams from universities across the Midwestern United States spend nearly a year designing and constructing their robot for the event, and travel to the UIUC Engineering Open House in March to compete in the  arena for the two-day (Fri-Sat) event. The Design Competition is funded by grants from ARM and is organised by the MRDC Committee at UIUC. 

According to the MRDC website, "The competition promotes engineering disciplines and offers students a chance to demonstrate their technical abilities and creativity while applying knowledge learned in engineering courses. Overall, the design competition presents a well-rounded multi-disciplinary engineering challenge to future engineers."

Annual competitions

23rd annual competition (2010) 
The 23rd annual competition featured 20 teams from five different universities that competed in a giant game of tic-tac-toe, played with colored balloons.

25th annual competition (2012) 
A course littered with foam balls was prepared for the 2012 competition. The competing teams had to navigate the course, collect the balls with their robots, and deposit them into scoring bins.

27th annual competition (2014) 
To win the competition, one had to design a “cone transportation system” that transported traffic cones to specified areas in the arena, known as "territories", to win points. After a team successfully transported cones to a territory, said territory was said to be "under the control" of that team. There were three tiers of territories that awarded 1, 3, and 5 points when "controlled" for 10 seconds. Territories "controlled" at the end of the match awarded 10, 30, and 40 points.

28th annual competition (2015) 
The course was set up with four quadrants, with each robot starting within their “home” corner. Robots had to traverse obstacles such as moats, teeter totters, tunnels and doors that covered the course in order to collect the balls they needed to score. There were three types of balls used in the competition, foam balls, wiffle balls, and golf balls. Each type has a different point value assigned to it based on how hard it is to collect and place it into the scoring bin. Foam balls and wiffle balls are scored by getting them into a rotating bin and golf balls are scored by putting them into a hole on a putting green.

A demolition round followed the main competition, where the robots demolished each other. The Illinois Institute of Technology's team was the champion of the demolition round.

29th annual competition (2016) 
The 2016 course included two levels, and gates that opened and closed. This forced teams to work on a strategy to get into the inner circle before scoring in the game.

31st annual competition (2018) 

In the 2018 competition, teams had to score different balls on their respective targets on a course. Each round had four of the teams competing, and each team was to score as many points as they could by scoring soccer balls in team soccer ball goals and/or scoring foam balls in the center bin.

32nd annual competition (2019) 

The 2019 competition included a sequencing game, where robots had to press buttons in a sequence, and a basketball game, where foam balls were to be shot into basketball hoops. There were a number of other rounds of challenges.

The 33rd annual competition (2020) is postponed indefinitely due to the COVID-19 outbreak.  There has not been a competition held since the 2019 competition.

References

External links

  
 UIUC Engineering Open House

Robotics competitions
 Recurring events established in 1987
University of Illinois Urbana-Champaign